Inge List (1916–2003) was an Austrian stage and film actress.

Selected filmography
 Grand Duchess Alexandra (1933)
 Princess Turandot (1934)
 The Csardas Princess (1934)
 Mazurka (1935)
 The Emperor's Candlesticks (1936)
 A Wedding Dream (1936)
 Signal in the Night (1937)
 Thirteen Chairs (1938)
 Late Love (1943)

References

Bibliography 
 Von Dassanowsky, Robert. Screening Transcendence: Film Under Austrofascism and the Hollywood Hope, 1933-1938. Indiana University Press, 2018

External links 
 

1916 births
2003 deaths
Actors from Salzburg
Austrian film actresses
Austrian stage actresses